The Brush Ground was a cricket ground in Loughborough, Leicestershire. Owned by the Brush Electrical Machines Company and used by the company cricket team, it was used as an outground by Leicestershire. They first played there in a first-class match against Hampshire in the 1953 County Championship. Leicestershire played there at least once a year (with the exception of 1964) until 1965, playing sixteen first-class matches. The ground was later purchased by Leicestershire County Council in 2017, with the ground redeveloped for residential purposes. The sports club moved to new premises three–times the size Nanpantan Road in Loughborough.

First-class records
 Highest team total: 426 all out by Surrey v Leicestershire, 1953
 Lowest team total: 36 all out by Leicestershire v Derbyshire, 1965
 Highest individual innings: 135 by Eric Bedser for Surrey v Leicestershire, 1953
 Best bowling in an innings: 10–78 by Tony Pearson for Cambridge University v Leicestershire, 1961
 Best bowling in a match: 14–119 by Butch White, for Hampshire v Leicestershire, 1963

See also
List of Leicestershire County Cricket Club grounds
List of cricket grounds in England and Wales

References

Cricket grounds in Leicestershire
Defunct cricket grounds in England
Leicestershire County Cricket Club
Defunct sports venues in Leicestershire
2017 disestablishments in England